The 2017 CONCACAF Gold Cup was the 14th edition of the CONCACAF Gold Cup, the biennial international men's soccer championship of the North, Central American and Caribbean region organized by CONCACAF, and 24th CONCACAF regional championship overall. The tournament was played between July 7–26, 2017 in the United States.

The United States won their sixth title with their 2–1 victory over Jamaica in the final.

Qualified teams
A total of twelve teams qualified for the tournament. Three berths were allocated to North America, four to Central America, four to the Caribbean, and one to the winners of the play-off between the two fifth-placed teams of the Caribbean zone and the Central American zone.

Bold indicates that the corresponding team was hosting the event.
1. This was Curaçao's first appearance since the dissolution of the Netherlands Antilles, as its direct successor (with regards to membership in football associations), inheriting the former nation's FIFA membership and competitive record.
2. French Guiana and Martinique are not FIFA members, and so did not have a FIFA Ranking.

Venues

The venues were announced on December 19, 2016. Levi's Stadium was announced as the venue of the final on February 1, 2017.

Notes

Draw
The United States and Mexico were announced as the seeded teams of Groups B and C respectively on December 19, 2016. Honduras, the winners of the 2017 Copa Centroamericana title were announced as being the seeded team in Group A on February 14, 2017.

The groups and match schedule were revealed on March 7, 2017, 10:00 PST (UTC−8), at Levi's Stadium in Santa Clara, California. At the time of the announcement, 11 of the 12 qualified teams were known, with the identity of the CFU–UNCAF play-off winners not yet known.

Squads

The twelve national teams involved in the tournament were required to register a squad of 23 players; only players in these squads were eligible to take part in the tournament.

A provisional list of forty players per national team was submitted to CONCACAF by June 2, 2017. The final list of 23 players per national team was submitted to CONCACAF by June 27, 2017. Three players per national team had to be goalkeepers.

National teams that reached the quarter-final stage were able to swap up to six players in the final squad with six players from the provisional list within 24 hours of their final group stage game.

Match officials
The match officials, which included 17 referees and 25 assistant referees, were announced on June 23, 2017.

Referees

  Drew Fischer
  Ricardo Montero
  Yadel Martínez
  Walter López
  Melvin Matamoros
  Óscar Moncada
  Héctor Rodríguez
  Roberto García Orozco
  Fernando Guerrero
  César Ramos
  John Pitti
  Kimbell Ward
  Joel Aguilar
  Mark Geiger
  Jair Marrufo
  Armando Villarreal

Assistant Referees

  Carlos Fernández 
  Juan Carlos Mora
  Hermenerito Lea
  Gerson López
  Melvyn Cruz
  Christian Ramírez
  Jesús Tábora
  José Luis Camargo
  Miguel Hernández
  Alberto Morín
  Marcos Quintero
  Marvin Torrentera
  Ronald Bruna
  Gabriel Victoria
  Daniel Williamson
  Graeme Browne
  Geonvany García
  William Torres
  Juan Francisco Zumba
  Joseph Bertrand
  Ainsley Rochard 
  Frank Anderson
  Charles Morgante
  Corey Rockwell

Group stage
The top two teams from each group and the two best third-placed teams qualified for the quarter-finals.

All match times listed are in EDT (UTC−4). If the venue is located in a different time zone, the local time is also given.

Tiebreakers
The ranking of each team in each group was determined as follows:
Greatest number of points obtained in group matches
Goal difference in all group matches
Greatest number of goals scored in all group matches
Greatest number of points obtained in group matches between the teams concerned;
Drawing of lots by the Gold Cup Committee

Group A

Group B

Group C

Ranking of third-placed teams
The best two third-placed teams which advanced to the knockout stage played the winners from another group in the quarter-finals.

Knockout stage

In the quarter-finals and semi-finals, if a match was tied after 90 minutes, extra time would not have been played and the match would be decided by a penalty shoot-out. In the final, if the match was tied after 90 minutes, extra time would have been played, where each team would have been allowed to make a fourth substitution. If still tied after extra time, the match would have been decided by a penalty shoot-out. Unlike the previous edition of the competition, there was no third place play-off.

Quarter-finals

Semi-finals

Final

Goalscorers

Awards

Winners

Individual awards
The following awards were given at the conclusion of the tournament.
Golden Ball Award:  Michael Bradley
Golden Boot Award:  Alphonso Davies
Golden Glove Award:  Andre Blake
Young Player Award:  Alphonso Davies
Fair Play Award:

Best XI
The technical study group selected the tournament's best XI.

Sponsors
 Allstate
 Cerveza Modelo de México
 Nike, Inc.
 Post Consumer Holdings
 Scotiabank
 Sprint Corporation

Theme songs
"The Arena" and "Don't Let This Feeling Fade" by American violinist Lindsey Stirling served as the official songs of the tournament. The latter features Rivers Cuomo of the band Weezer and rapper Lecrae.

"Bia Beraghsim" by Persian-Swedish singer Mahan Moin served as the official anthem of the tournament

"Levántate" by Puerto Rican singer Gale served as the official Spanish-language song of the tournament.

"Thunder" and "Whatever It Takes" by American rock band Imagine Dragons also served as official anthems of the tournament.

Notes

References

External links

CONCACAF Gold Cup , CONCACAF.com

 
2017
International association football competitions hosted by the United States
Gold Cup
2017 in American soccer
July 2017 sports events in the United States